Obernzenn is a municipality in the district of Neustadt (Aisch)-Bad Windsheim in Bavaria in Germany.

Personalities 

 Johann Michael Zeyher (1770-1843), Baden director of the theater
 Johann Appler (1892-1978), NSDAP politician, SA and SS man, Reichstag deputy
 Christian Schmidt (born 1957), CSU politician, Federal Minister of Food and Agriculture (Germany)
 Thorsten Kirschbaum (born 1987), footballer

References

Neustadt (Aisch)-Bad Windsheim